The  (Tournelle Bridge in English), is an arch bridge spanning the river Seine in Paris.

History

The first, a wooden bridge, was built in 1620. It was subsequently washed away by ice in 1637, and again on 21 January 1651. A stone bridge was erected in its place in 1654. It was demolished in 1918 and replaced by the current bridge in 1928, after it suffered several natural disasters, especially the flood of 1910.

The  was intentionally built lacking symmetry, in order to emphasize the shapeless landscape in the part of the Seine that it bestrides. Consisting of a grand central arch that links the riverbanks via two smaller arches, one on each side, it's decorated on the Eastern bank with a pylon built on the left pier's cutwater, and a statue of Saint Geneviève, the patron saint of Paris, atop of the pylon, designed by Polish-French monumental sculptor Paul Landowski.

The term "Tournelle" traces its origin to a square turret constructed at the end of the 12th Century on the fortress of Phillipe Auguste.

Numerous scenes of Highlander: The Series were filmed along the Quai de la Tournelle near and underneath Pont de la Tournelle between 1992 and 1998.

Access

See also 
 List of crossings of the River Seine

References

External links

  Bridge history
  More bridge history

Bridges over the River Seine in Paris
Bridges completed in 1658
Bridges completed in 1928
Buildings and structures in the 4th arrondissement of Paris
1658 establishments in France